Me and Mom is an American detective comedy/drama series that aired on ABC from April 5, 1985 to May 17, 1985.

Premise
Set in San Francisco, the series centered on private eye Kate Morgan and her mother Zena Hunnicutt, a wealthy socialite and widow who always meddled in Kate's cases.

Cast
Lisa Eilbacher as Kate Morgan
Holland Taylor as Zena Hunnicutt
James Earl Jones as Lou Garfield

Episodes

References

External links

1985 American television series debuts
1985 American television series endings
American Broadcasting Company original programming
Television shows set in San Francisco
English-language television shows
Television series by CBS Studios